Emma Lord is an American author of romance novels in the young adult fiction genre. Her novels are Tweet Cute, You Have a Match, and When You Get the Chance.
Her debut novel, Tweet Cute, is a YA retelling of You've Got Mail and was listed on Cosmopolitan's list of the 100 Best YA Novels of All Time. Her sophomore novel You Have a Match was the Winter 2021 YA Pick for Reese's Book Club  and a New York Times bestseller. Her most recent novel, When You Get the Chance, was inspired by Mamma Mia! and tells the story of an aspiring theatre actress on the search her mother after finding her father's old LiveJournal account.

Bibliography 
 Tweet Cute (2020)
 You Have a Match (2021)
 When You Get the Chance (2022)
 Begin Again (2023)

References 

Women writers of young adult literature

American women novelists

Living people

Year of birth missing (living people)